Monte Bar is a mountain of the Lugano Prealps, located north of Lugano in the canton of Ticino, Switzerland. It lies on the range west of the Gazzirola, between the Val d'Isone and the Val Colla.

References

External links
 Monte Bar on Hikr

Mountains of the Alps
Mountains of Ticino
Mountains of Switzerland
One-thousanders of Switzerland